The following is a list of episodes from the anime adaptation of Tsukuyomi: Moon Phase. The anime series is directed by Akiyuki Shinbo, and was produced by Shaft. Mayori Sekijima was the series composition writer, and Daisaku Kume composed the music. Masahiro Aizawa designed the characters and served as chief animation director, and Shaft animator Kazuhiro Oota acted as chief animation director for the Blu-Ray release of episodes 12 through 15. Oota was also credited as the animation supervisor (an equivalent role to "chief animation director") for episodes 9-10, 20, and the OVA. Four episodes were outsourced outside of Shaft: episodes 8, 14, and 20 to Studio Pastoral; and episode 23 to Nomad.

Notes

References

External links
Japanese Official site (Japanese)
TV Tokyo official site (Japanese)
 

Tsukuyomi Moon Phase
Lists of Japanese television series episodes